Matsalu National Park (previously Matsalu Nature Reserve, often just Matsalu) is a nature reserve and national park situated in Lääne and Pärnu Counties, Estonia.

Matsalu Bay is one of the most important wetland bird areas in Europe, due to its prime position on the East Atlantic Flyway. Large numbers of migratory birds use Matsalu as a staging area. Every spring over two million waterfowl pass Matsalu, of which around 1.6 million are long-tailed ducks.

Matsalu National Park is a home for a number of endangered species, many of which are listed in the Estonian IUCN Red List, including the white-tailed eagle of the highest conservation category, a lot of bird species of the second and third protection categories, 22 strongly protected plant species, the natterjack toad, and ten species of mammals of the second conservation category.

Description

Matsalu Bay is shallow, brackish and rich in nutrients. Water salinity is approximately 0.7 per mil. The bay's shoreline lacks high banks and is populated mostly with shingle shores, with muddy and overgrown reed in the innermost, sheltered part of the bay.

Kasari River is the biggest of several rivers that run into Matsalu Bay. The delta of the Kasari River is not in its natural condition due to dredging between 1930 and 1960; the alluvial meadow of the delta, most of which is actively managed, is one of the biggest open wet meadows in Europe. Reeds and rushes surrounding the main channel expand westwards up to  every year. Annual inflow into the Matsalu Bay from the Kasari River exceeds the volume of the bay itself approximately eight times; average seasonal variation of the Kasari River exceeds . The rivers carry large quantities of nutrient-rich sediments into the bay from an over  drainage basin. The sediments are deposited in river estuaries, allowing reedbeds to expand.

A total of 282 bird species have been recorded in Matsalu, among which 175 are nesting and 33 are transmigrant waterfowl. 49 species of fish and 47 species of mammals are registered in the area of the nature reserve, along with 772 species of vascular plants.

Every spring over two million waterfowl pass Matsalu, including 10,000—20,000 Bewick's swans, 10,000 greater scaups, common goldeneyes, tufted ducks, goosanders and many others. A colony of up to 20,000 barnacle geese, over 10,000 greylag geese and thousands of waders stop on the coastal pastures in spring. The most numerous birds of passage (around 1.6 million) are long-tailed ducks. Approximately 35,000—40,000 ducks feed in the reedbeds in spring. In autumn, about 300,000 migratory waterfowl pass Matsalu. The wetland is the biggest autumn stopping ground of common cranes in Europe. The highest recorded number of cranes at the park has been 23,000.

History

Scientific research in Matsalu started around 1870, when Valerian Russow, the curator of the Natural History Museum of the University of Tartu, gave a short overview of birds near Matsalu Bay. Between 1928 and 1936 Eerik Kumari researched birds in Matsalu and suggested a creation of the bird protection area there in 1936. In 1939, parts of the bay (Virtsu-Puhtu) were protected for mud used in mud-baths.

Research in Matsalu became regular in 1945, when the Institute of Botany and Zoology of the Estonian Academy of Sciences 
established a research base in Penijõe. Matsalu Nature Reserve was founded in 1957, mainly to protect nesting, moulting and migratory birds. The first permanent workers (administrators and scientists) started in 1958 and the Penijõe research base became the administrative centre of the newly created nature reserve. The Estonian Bird Ringing Centre, the coordinator of bird ringing in Estonia, is also located in Penijõe.

In 1976, Matsalu was included in the list of wetlands of international importance under the International Convention on the Protection of Wetlands (Ramsar Convention).
The European Diploma of Protected Areas was awarded to Matsalu Nature Reserve in 2003 by the Council of Europe, in recognition of the park's success in preserving the diversity of habitats and the numerous species of birds and other biota groups in the nature reserve. Matsalu is the only nature reserve in Estonia to hold the European Diploma. The diploma was extended for five years in 2008.

In 2004, Matsalu Nature Reserve, along with surrounding areas, became Matsalu National Park. Matsalu has seven bird-watching towers (Penijõe, Kloostri, Haeska, Suitsu, Jugasaare, Küdeva and Keemu) and three hiking trails.

Matsalu International Nature Film Festival

Matsalu International Nature Film Festival is held every autumn in the nearby town of Lihula. The festival is organized by the non-profit organization MTÜ Matsalu Loodusfilmide Festival, which was set up in late 2003. In February 2010, MTÜ Matsalu Loodusfilmide Festival partnered with the Estonian State Forest Management Centre (RMK) and will jointly organize the film festivals in the future.

The first Matsalu Nature Film Festival was held between October 3 and October 5, 2003, in Lihula with a competitive program of 23 films from 7 countries. More than 2,500 people visited the festival that year. The second festival was held between September 23, and September 25, 2004, with participants from 14 countries, a competitive program of 35 films and around 5,000 visitors. The third festival took place between September 22 and September 25, 2005, with a competitive program of 39 films from 16 countries and over 7,000 visitors. The fourth festival, held between September 21 and September 24 in 2006, had 21 participating countries and 41 competing films. The fifth Matsalu Nature Film Festival was held between September 19 and September 23, 2007, and had more than 7,000 visitors. Organizers admit that as the festival is held on a nature reserve, it cannot grow much larger in a little town and therefore plan to bring mostly European nature documentaries to the festival, at the same time not forgetting the human-related topics.

In 2007, organizers of the Matsalu International Nature Film Festival received the Environmental Award of the Year from the Estonian Ministry of Environment. The ministry pointed out persistent and successful organization of the film festival over the years, which has popularized nature protection and contributed significantly to environmental awareness.

Gallery

See also
 Protected areas of Estonia
 Lääne County
 List of national parks in the Baltics
 List of protected areas of Estonia
 List of Ramsar sites in Estonia

References

External links

 
 Map of Matsalu National Park
 Birds of Matsalu (PDF)
 Plants of Matsalu (PDF)
 Matsalu tourism information
 Migratory birds and the Matsalu Nature Reserve Estonica

National parks of Estonia
Ramsar sites in Estonia
Geography of Lääne County
Landforms of Lääne County
Protected areas established in 1957
Tourist attractions in Lääne County